Italian Panamanians  are Panamanian citizens of Italian descent or origin, who are mainly descendant of Italians attracted by the construction of the Panama Canal, between the 19th and 20th century.

History
The history of Italian immigrants in Panama begins from 1510, when several Italian citizens decided to emigrate to Panama City founded by Pedrarias Davila.

From 1520 some Genoese merchants ruled the commerce of Old Panama (Panamá Viejo) on the Pacific Ocean for a century, thanks to a concession given by the Spaniards, who had the Republic of Genoa as allies.

Between 1596 and 1597 already there were 11 Italians in Panama, for naturalization and the right to stay in Panama. According to a census around 1607, Panama City had 548 inhabitants (some of them descendants of the first Genoese settlers), of whom 53 were foreigners and of these 18 were Italians, 6 of which were domiciled by the composition of foreigners.

After de independence, the Italian presence continued to emphasize immigrants such as Agostino Codazzi and Napoleone Garella, who in the nineteenth century and at different times, performed studies that recommended Panama as the ideal for the construction of an interoceanic canal.
Meanwhile, in 1844, Garella was the first engineer assigned by the French government to find a route for the construction of the Canal and in his studies recommended the route of the isthmus of Panama over the routes suggested by the isthmus of Tehuantepec and Nicaragua. During the isthmus canal project and construction continued to arrive eminent Italians from scientists, artists, priests and merchants, to craftsmen and laborers. They founded families whose descendants were quickly integrated the dynamic process of formation of the Panamanian nationality. One was elected President of Panama in 1949 and 1960: Roberto Francisco Chiari Remón (March 2, 1905 in Panama City – March 1, 1981) was the President of Panama in 1949 and later from 1960 to 1964. He belonged to the Liberal Party. In the 1920s even his father (Rodolfo Chiari) was president.

The wave of Italian immigration occurred around 1880. With the construction of the Canal by the Universal Panama Canal Company came the arrival of up to 2,000 Italians. Two years later in 1882, at the initiative of Mr. Oreste Badio (a prominent member of the Italian colony), the "Italian Benevolent Society" was established in order to help the countrymen affected by disease or who needed some kind of help, with an initial membership of 37 persons.

To this migration belongs the ancestors of another Panamanian president: Nicolás Ardito Barletta Vallarino (born August 21, 1938, in Aguadulce, in the province of Coclé) was President of Panama from October 11, 1984, to September 28, 1985. The President Barletta Vallarino belonged to the Democratic Revolutionary Party (PRD).

Ricardo Martinelli served as president from 2009 through 2014, during which time the Panamanian economy grew robustly and steadily. His achievements were even lauded by The Economist: "Though it lies in Central America, the poorest and most violent region in the West, the country’s 3.6m citizens are now richer than most Latin Americans."

Indeed, Martinelli - during his five-year presidential mandate - promoted a huge urban development of Panama city, with the construction of some of the tallest skyscrapers in Latin America. Another Italo-Panamanian, Alberto Motta, has successfully created companies in Panama and with a "Fundacion" is helping the poorest Panamanians.

Actually there it is an agreement/treaty between the Italian and Panamanian governments, that facilitates since 1966 the Italian immigration to Panama for investments

Notable Italian-Panamanians

 Rodolfo Chiari, President of Panama in 1924-1928
 Roberto Francisco Chiari Remón, President of Panama in 1949 and in 1960-1964
 Nicolás Ardito Barletta Vallarino, President of Panama in 1984-1985
 Ricardo Martinelli, President of Panama in 2009-2014
 Miguel Bosé, singer and actor
 Elida Campodónico,  teacher, women's rights advocate and attorney
 Giosue Cozzarelli, model and YouTube celebrity
 Valerio de Sanctis de Ferrari, businessman and politician
 Moisés Giroldi, military commander
 Hugo Spadafora, physician and guerrilla fighter
 Sage Steele, television anchor

Notes

Bibliography

 Cappelli, Vittorio. Nelle altre Americhe. Calabresi in Colombia, Panamà, Costa Rica e Guatemala. La Mongolfiera Ed. Doria di Cassano Jonio, 2004.
 English, Peter. Panama in Pictures. Lerner Publishing Group. London, 1989

See also
 Italian diaspora

History of Panama
Ethnic groups in Panama